Csordás is a Hungarian surname. Notable people with the surname include:

Csaba Csordás (born 1977), Hungarian swimmer
György Csordás (1928–2000), Hungarian swimmer
Lajos Csordás (1932–1968), Hungarian footballer

Hungarian-language surnames